Ángel Ariel González González (born 4 February 2003) is a Paraguayan footballer currently playing as a goalkeeper for Porto B, on loan from Club Libertad.

Club career
In 2021, after first-choice goalkeeper Martín Silva contracted COVID-19 and backup goalkeeper Carlos Servín was injured, González was given two games in the Club Libertad first team.

International career
González has represented Paraguay at youth international level. In January 2022, he was called up to the Paraguay national football team.

Club statistics
.

Notes

References

2003 births
Living people
Sportspeople from Asunción
Paraguayan footballers
Paraguay youth international footballers
Association football goalkeepers
Paraguayan Primera División players
Club Libertad footballers
FC Porto players
FC Porto B players
Paraguayan expatriate footballers
Paraguayan expatriate sportspeople in Portugal
Expatriate footballers in Portugal